The 2017 St. Petersburg Ladies' Trophy was a professional tennis tournament played on indoor hard courts. It was the eighth edition of the tournament and second time as a WTA Premier tournament. It was part of the 2017 WTA Tour and was held between 30 January and 5 February 2017.

Point distribution

Prize money

1Qualifiers prize money is also the Round of 32 prize money.
*per team

Singles main draw entrants

Seeds

1 Rankings as of January 16, 2017.

Other entrants
The following players received wildcards into the singles main draw:
  Anna Kalinskaya
  Natalia Vikhlyantseva

The following players received entry from the qualifying draw:
  Kirsten Flipkens
  Elise Mertens
  Andrea Petkovic
  Stefanie Vögele

The following player received entry as a lucky loser:
  Donna Vekić

Withdrawals
Before the tournament
  Barbora Strýcová → replaced by  Ana Konjuh
  Stefanie Vögele → replaced by  Donna Vekić

Retirements
  Johanna Larsson (Left hip injury)

Doubles main draw entrants

Seeds

1 Rankings as of January 16, 2017.

Other entrants 
The following pair received a wildcard into the doubles main draw:
  Anastasia Bukhanko /  Ana Konjuh

The following pairs received entry as alternates:
  Isabella Shinikova /  Valeriya Strakhova

Withdrawals
Before the tournament
  Johanna Larsson (Left hip injury)

Champions

Singles

  Kristina Mladenovic def.  Yulia Putintseva, 6–2, 6–7(3–7), 6–4.

Doubles

  Jeļena Ostapenko /  Alicja Rosolska def.  Darija Jurak /  Xenia Knoll, 3–6, 6–2, [10–5].

References

External links
 *Official website

St. Petersburg Ladies' Trophy
St. Petersburg Ladies Trophy
2017 in Russian women's sport
February 2017 sports events in Russia
2017 in Russian tennis